Gilbert McAdam (born 30 March 1967 in Alice Springs) is an Indigenous Australian former Australian rules football player and one of three McAdam brothers to play in the Australian Football League (AFL).

Playing career

Early career
McAdam grew up in Alice Springs, where his father was president of the South Alice Football Club. His older brother, Greg McAdam, had earlier found his way to the St Kilda Football Club via North Adelaide in the SANFL. McAdam moved to Darwin to play in the Northern Territory Football League (NTFL) with the Southern Districts Football Club when he was just 11 years old. In 1979, Gilbert McAdam was chosen as the 12-year-old schoolboys Northern Territory captain who captained the team to victory to become the first Northern Territory team to win a national title. The stand out players were McAdams and Scott Parker who was the youngest competitor to have played in the carnival.

In 1986, McAdam played 3 games for Claremont in the West Australian Football League (WAFL) before returning home to Darwin.  After a few seasons he went on to play in the South Australian National Football League (SANFL) with Central District Football Club, taking out the 1989 Magarey Medal. McAdam was the first indigenous player to take out the award.

AFL career
McAdam was drafted number 17 in the 1989 VFL Draft by St Kilda Football Club.  After a few inconsistent years, he was traded to the Brisbane Bears.

McAdam left the AFL in 1996 after several years of service to the Brisbane Bears (58 games) for a total of 111 AFL matches. He returned to the Central District Football Club for the 1998 SANFL season and retired from football altogether in 1999.

His younger brother, Adrian, later found his way to a brief career with the North Melbourne Football Club.
Gilbert was drafted by Collingwood but refused to return from retirement.

Coaching career
McAdam returned to Alice Springs and coached South Alice to a premiership.  In 2006, he moved back to Darwin to coach the Darwin Football Club.

Post-football career
In 2007, McAdam took up a position with the Academy of Sport, Health and Education in Shepparton, Victoria. The academy uses participation in sport as an avenue for Indigenous people to undertake education and training within a trusted and culturally appropriate environment. His role with the academy is as a sports and personal development officer. He co-hosts the TV program The Marngrook Footy Show with Grant Hansen, currently screening on NITV on Thursday nights.

References

Brisbane Bears players
St Kilda Football Club players
1967 births
Living people
Southern Districts Football Club players
North Adelaide Football Club players
Claremont Football Club players
Central District Football Club players
Indigenous Australian players of Australian rules football
Magarey Medal winners
Australian rules footballers from the Northern Territory